In enzymology, an L-2-hydroxyglutarate dehydrogenase is an enzyme that catalyzes the chemical reaction

(S)-2-hydroxyglutarate + acceptor  2-oxoglutarate + reduced acceptor

Thus, the two substrates of this enzyme are (S)-2-hydroxyglutarate and acceptor, whereas its two products are 2-oxoglutarate and reduced acceptor.
 Enzymes which preferentially catalyze the conversion of the (R) stereoisomer of 2-oxoglutarate also exist in both mammals and plants

 
and are named D-2-hydroxyglutarate dehydrogenase.  L-2-hydroxyglutarate is produced by promiscuous action of malate dehydrogenase on 2-oxoglutarate; L-2-hydroxyglutarate dehydrogenase is an example of a metabolite repair enzyme that oxidizes L-2-hydroxyglutarate back to 2-oxoglutarate.

Nomenclature 

This enzyme belongs to the family of oxidoreductases, specifically those acting on the CH-OH group of donor with other acceptors.  The systematic name of this enzyme class is (S)-2-hydroxyglutarate:acceptor 2-oxidoreductase. Other names in common use include:

 (S)-2-hydroxyglutarate:(acceptor) 2-oxidoreductase
 alpha-hydroxyglutarate dehydrogenase
 alpha-hydroxyglutarate dehydrogenase (NAD specific)
 alpha-hydroxyglutarate oxidoreductase
 alpha-ketoglutarate reductase
 hydroxyglutaric dehydrogenase
 L-alpha-hydroxyglutarate dehydrogenase
 L-alpha-hydroxyglutarate:NAD 2-oxidoreductase

Clinical significance 

Deficiency in this enzyme in humans (L2HGDH) or in the model plant Arabidopsis thaliana (At3g56840) leads to accumulation of L-2-hydroxyglutarate. In humans this results in the fatal neurometabolic disorder 2-Hydroxyglutaric aciduria whereas plants seem to be unaffected by elevated cellular concentrations of this compound

See also 
 L2HGDH
 D2HGDH
 D-2-hydroxyglutarate dehydrogenase
 2-hydroxyglutarate synthase
 Alpha-Hydroxyglutaric acid
 2-Hydroxyglutaric aciduria
 Hydroxyacid-oxoacid transhydrogenase

References

Further reading 

 
 

EC 1.1.99
Enzymes of unknown structure